Ugly As Sin were an English post-punk/pop-rock band from London formed in 1989.

History 
The band Ugly As Sin was formed by singer and songwriter Ian Walker and was signed to China Records. As a second founding member Boris Pikula (ex Andi Sexgang, Huckleberry Finn) joined in July 1989, followed by Fiona Lawrence in August 1989.
As this trio, the band was to be commercially marketed by the record company, thus the album title "The Good, the Bad and the Ugly".

In summer 1989 the recording of the debut album started, engineered and produced on 16-track by Paul Mex at Mex One Recordings in Watford. It was released in the beginning of 1990.

The band's first gig was on October 3 1989 at the Kings Head in Fulham, London, supporting the supergroup Havana 3am (ex-the Clash members) on tour. Their second tour was supporting the Brixton rock-trio Underneath What, going straight into their 3rd tour supporting the Stranglers throughout the UK (96 Tour, the last feat. Hugh Cornwell).

Concerts

Havana 3am, Support 
 Oct 3 1989 - London Kings Head
 Oct 5 1989 - Newcastle Polytechnic
 Oct 11 1989 - Kent University
 Oct 12 1989 - London ULU (own show)
 Oct 19 1989 - Uxbridge Brunel University
 Oct 20 1989 - Reading After Dark
 Oct 21 1989 - Manchester University
 Oct 24 1989 - Doncaster
 Oct 29 1989 - Swamsea University
 Oct 30 1989 - Cardiff University

Underneath What, Support 
 Feb 5 1990 - Newcastle Riverside
 Feb 6 1990 - Carlisle Pagoda
 Feb 7 1990 - Leeds Duchess of York
 Feb 8 1990 - Birmingham University
 Feb 9 1990 - Banbury Football Club
 Feb 11 1990 - Doncaster The Jug
 Feb 12 1990 - Lincoln New Vienna
 Feb 13 1990 - Leicester Princess Charlotte
 Feb 14 1990 - Manchester University
 Feb 15 1990 - Bristol Bierkeller
 Feb 16 1990 - King's Lynn La's
 Feb 17 1990 - London Marquee

The Stranglers - 96 Tours, Support 
 Feb 19 1990 - Bristol Colston Hall
 Feb 20 1990 - Poole Arts Centre
 Feb 21 1990 - Torbay Lesure Centre
 Feb 22 1990 - Newport Centre
 Feb 23 1990 - Leicester De Montford Hall
 Feb 24 1990 - London Brixton Academy
 Feb 26 1990 - Crawley Leisure Centre
 Feb 27 1990 - Nottingham Royal Concert Hall
 Feb 28 1990 - Newcastle City Hall
 March 1, 1990 - Wolverhampton Civic Hall
 March 2, 1990 - Bradford St Georges Hall
 March 4, 1990 - Aberdeen Capitol
 March 5, 1990 - Edinburgh Playhouse
 March 6, 1990 - Carlisle Sands Centre
 March 7, 1990 - Preston Guildhall
 March 8, 1990 - Scarborough Futurist Theartre
 March 9, 1990 - Manchester Apollo
 March 10, 1990 - Sheffield City Hall
 March 11, 1990 - Birmingham Humingbird
 March 13, 1990 - Portsmouth Guildhall
 March 14, 1990 - Glouchester Leisure Centre
 March 16, 1990 - Folkestone Leas Cliff Hall
 March 17, 1990 - Cambridge Corn Exchange
 March 18, 1990 - Reading Hexagon
 March 19, 1990 - Guildford Civic Hall
 March 20, 1990 - Southend Cliffs Pavilion
 March 21, 1990 - London Brixton Academy

Own shows 
 Feb 23 1990 - London Goldsmith College
 Mar 15 1990 - Manchester U-Mist
 Mar 23 1990 - Uxbridge Brunel University

Discography 
 The Good, the Bad and the Ugly (1990, China Records)
 The Good, the Bad and the Bootleg (4-song EP, 1990, China Records)
 Terminal Love / Wasted (Single, Sept. 1989, China Records)
 Pain / Terminal Dub (Single, 1990, China Records)

References

External links 
 
 
 
 

English new wave musical groups
British pub rock music groups
Musical groups established in 1989
Musical groups from London